The Eurovision Song Contest 2018 jurors were a group of 215 individuals, appointed by the participating broadcasters, who voted in the Eurovision Song Contest 2018. In all shows, half of the final results were determined by juries.

Background

In the  grand final, 50% of the voting was determined by televoting and 50% by juries, a system which has been used in all semi-finals and grand finals since.

This led to some jurors being replaced before the contest.

Format
Each country had a five-member jury, of which one member served as chairperson, composed of music industry professionals who were citizens of that country.

The juries watched and voted during the second dress rehearsal, held the evening before each broadcast show. Each jury voted in the semi-final that their country was competing in, or, in the case of an automatic finalist, the semi-final their country had been drawn to vote in. All juries voted in the grand final.

Each juror ranked all competing songs, with the exception of their own country's song, from their favourite to their least favourite. Each individual ranking in one country's jury was combined to produce an overall ranking for the country. The highest ranked song received 12 points, the second highest ranked song received 10 points, and the third to tenth highest ranked songs received 8 to 1 points.

Jurors
The jurors of the 43 participating countries were as follows:

Withdrawn jurors
Some jurors listed on the original list of jurors, published on 30 April 2018, did not go on to vote in the contest.

References

Eurovision Song Contest 2018
Jurors